Ismarus is a genus of wasps belonging to the family Ismaridae, and presently the sole extant genus in the family (a second genus was recently removed). About 50 species are known in this small relictual group, all of which appear to be hyperparasitoids that parasitize Dryinidae (that attack leafhoppers).

Ismarus was formerly included in the family Diapriidae, but differ from diapriid wasps by lacking a facial projection from which the antenna arise, and characterized by various degrees of fusion of the metasomal terga.

References

Parasitica
Hymenoptera genera
Hyperparasites